Daniel O'Keeffe, styled as Mr Justice Daniel O'Keeffe, was chairperson of the Standards in Public Office Commission from 11 February 2014 until 10 February 2020. He is a former Judge of the High Court (2008-2013).

As Chairman of the Standards in Public Office Commission, he was also an ex-officio member (Commissioner) of the Commission for Public Service Appointments.  He is also a member of the Inquiry Panel appointed by the Central Bank of Ireland.

He was Chairman of the Irish Takeover Panel from 1997 to 2008.

He was Chairman of the Second Report of the Public Service Benchmarking Body which reported to the Minister for Finance in 2007.

Education and career
Born in Ennis, Co. Clare in 1943, he was educated at Clongowes Wood College.  He was called to the Bar in 1964 having graduated from University College Dublin and the King's Inns. He was appointed a Senior Counsel in 1985. He practised at the Bar until his appointment to the High Court in 2008.

He qualified as a Chartered Accountant.

References

External links
Standards in Public Office Commission
Commission for Public Service Appointments
Irish Courts Service
University College Dublin
The Honorable Society of King's Inns

High Court judges (Ireland)
Living people
20th-century Irish lawyers
Alumni of University College Dublin
People educated at Clongowes Wood College
Irish barristers
People from Ennis
1943 births
Alumni of King's Inns